Anagestone, also known as 3-deketo-6α-methyl-17α-hydroxyprogesterone or as 6α-methyl-17α-hydroxypregn-4-en-20-one, is a progestin which was never marketed.

An acylated derivative, anagestone acetate, was formerly used clinically as a pharmaceutical drug.

While anagestone is sometimes used as a synonym for anagestone acetate, it usually refers to anagestone acetate, not anagestone.

References

Abandoned drugs
Ketones
Pregnanes
Progestogens